van Kooten is a surname of Dutch origin. People with the name include:
Cees van Kooten (1948–2015), Dutch professional football player and manager
Kees van Kooten (born 1941), Dutch comedian, television actor, and author
Half of the comedy duo of Van Kooten en De Bie
Kim van Kooten (born 1974), Dutch actress and screenwriter
Theodorus van Kooten (1749–1813), Dutch poet, professor and politician

Dutch-language surnames
Surnames of Dutch origin